Lawrence Edward Joseph "Leon" Feuerbach (July 11, 1879 in Manhattan, New York – November 16, 1911 in Saranac Lake, New York) was an American athlete who competed mainly in the shot put.

Biography
He competed for the United States in the 1904 Summer Olympics held in St Louis in the shot put where he won the bronze medal behind fellow Americans Ralph Rose and Wesley Coe. He died at Saranac Lake, New York.

References

External links

1879 births
1911 deaths
American male shot putters
Olympic bronze medalists for the United States in track and field
Athletes (track and field) at the 1904 Summer Olympics
Medalists at the 1904 Summer Olympics
Olympic tug of war competitors of the United States
Tug of war competitors at the 1904 Summer Olympics
Track and field athletes from New York City
Sportspeople from Manhattan
NYU Violets athletes